Grabenbach may refer to:

 Grabenbach (Ablach), a river of Baden-Württemberg, Germany, tributary of the Ablach
 Grabenbach (Bad Reichenhall), a river of Bavaria, Germany, tributary of the Saalach, in Bad Reichenhall
 Grabenbach Formation, a geologic formation in Austria